Hibernia, of 435 tons, was launched at Cowes in 1810. She operated as a letter of marque West Indiaman and in 1814 engaged in a noteworthy single-ship action with the American privateer  during which she repelled her more heavily-armed attacker. In 1819 she transported convicts to Van Diemen's Land. She was last listed in 1840.

Career
Hibernia entered Lloyd's Register (LR) in 1810 with J. "Lennen" master. He was also her owner. Her trade was Cowes-West Indies.

Captain John Lennon received a letter of marque on 5 February 1810.

On 26 January 1811 Westmoreland, of Liverpool, ran foul of Hibernia off Scilly, causing Hibernia to lose her bowsprit, head, and cutwater. Hibernia, which had sailing from London to St Thomas's, put back into Portsmouth on 1 March.

In 1812, orders were issued that no vessels should leave St Thomas's without convoy, on account of the American privateers. Hibernia and three other merchantmen, whose aggregate cargoes were valued at half a million sterling, had long been waiting. Unwilling to detain them further, Governor Maclean had agreed to their sailing without convoy, on condition that Lennon hoist his pennant as commodore. Lennon had to post a bond of £500 that he would execute the duties of commodore; the other three captains had to post bonds of £250 each that they would follow signals and obey orders. Although , Commodore Joshua Barney, an American privateer of superior force, harassed the British vessels, Lennon brought them safe into the English Channel on 18 October 1812. He also repatriated the mate and crew of the packet , which Rossie had earlier captured.

In late 1812 or early 1813, Hibernia captured a Swedish schooner carrying 900 barrels of flour. The American privateer Orders in Council captured the schooner from Hibernias prize crew.  in turn captured the schooner from the Americans and sent her into Antigua.

On 24 November, Hibernia ran onshore at Margate as she was sailing from London to St Thomas's. She was got off little or now damage and the next day sailed from The Downs for Portsmoutyh.

Action with a privateer

On 11 January 1814, Hibernia, of 22 men and six guns, Lennon, master, encountered the American privateer Comet, of 14 guns and 125 men, Thomas Boyle, master. This time, an engagement ensued.

After an intense 9-hour single-ship action that left one man killed on Hibernia, and 11 wounded (who were expected to recover), Hibernia succeeded in driving Comet off. Comet had three men killed and eight men wounded. One first-hand American account reported that Comet had six dead and 16 wounded, and that Hibernia had sailed off first. Comet retired to Puerto Rico to refit. Hibernia arrived at St Thomas's that same day.

Two lawsuits with the underwriters of Hibernia'''s cargo followed. Lennon and his owners were liable for £8,000 in damages, or more than double the loss that would have been incurred if Lennon had surrendered.

Convict transportHibernia departed Portsmouth on 20 November 1818. Adverse winds in the Channel and again off the coast of Australia delayed her voyage with the result that she arrived in Hobart on 11 May 1819 after a transit of 172 days. She had embarked 160 male prisoners, of whom three died on the way. Hibernia continued on to Sydney in June with cabin passengers. Hibernia departed Sydney bound for Calcutta via Batavia.

Two incidents had marred the voyage to Australia. On 8 January 1819, two seamen behaved in a mutinous manner. The rest of the crew objected to the men being put in irons, but eventually all but two others returned to their duties. Eventually 12 men from Hibernia joined Eurydices crew; Wauchope sent only three men in return. The resulting crew shortage on Hibernia delayed her sailing.

On her voyage to Hobart Hibernias surgeon was Charles Carter, who had a deep-seated antipathy towards clergymen. Unfortunately for Carter, Hibernia carried Rev. Richard Hill. Hill complained that Carter had prohibited Hill from visiting prisoners in the hospital quarters, and had ridiculed Hill's efforts at moral instruction. Carter countered that visits from clergymen depressed the sick. Eventually, Carter's inability to exercise tact when dealing with the clergy led to his dismissal from the convict service.

Later career
On 5 April 1825 Hibernia, Captain Robert Gillies, arrived at Sydney from England. She was  carrying stores for the government. She left Plymouth on 8 November 1823 and came out via the Cape of Good Hope, which she left on 1 February 1824. She also stopped at Hobart Town, leaving there for Sydney on 24 February.

In May 1825 Hibernia got on shore on the Hooghly River and had to put back to port to be docked.

The table below is from Lloyd's Register (LR). The data in the Register was only as accurate as owners chose to keep it updated.

Notes

Citations

References
 
  The article cites the following: Nav. and Mil. Gazettes, 24 July, 7 Aug., 21 Aug., and 18 Sept. 1841, by David Burn. See Burn's Chivalry of the Merchant Marine'', London, 1841, and Brenton's Naval History, Vol. 2.
 

1810 ships
Age of Sail merchant ships
Merchant ships of the United Kingdom
Convict ships to Tasmania